The 2008 College Football All-America Team is composed of the following All-American first teams: American Football Coaches Association (AFCA), Associated Press (AP), Football Writers Association of America (FWAA), Walter Camp Football Foundation, The Sporting News, Sports Illustrated, Pro Football Weekly, ESPN, CBS Sports, College Football News, Rivals.com, and Scout.com. 

Being selected to the College Football All-America Team is an honor given annually to the best American college football players at their respective positions.  The original All-America team was the 1889 College Football All-America Team selected by Caspar Whitney with assistance from football pioneer Walter Camp.  The National Collegiate Athletics Association (NCAA), the governing body of American intercollegiate sports, officially recognizes All-Americans selected by the AFCA, AP, FWAA, Sporting News, and Walter Camp Foundation to determine consensus All-Americans (denoted bold).  At least three of these five major selector organizations must select a player in order for him to be recognized as a "consensus" All-American by the NCAA.

Offense

Quarterback
 Sam Bradford, Oklahoma (AP, TSN, CBS, ESPN, Rivals)
 Colt McCoy, Texas (FWAA, WCFF, SI)
 Graham Harrell, Texas Tech (AFCA)
 Matthew Stafford, Georgia (PFW)
 Tim Tebow, Florida (CFN)

Running back
 Shonn Greene, Iowa (AFCA, AP, FWAA, TSN, WCFF, CBS, CFN, ESPN, Rivals, SI)
 Javon Ringer, Michigan State (AP, WCFF)
 Donald Brown, Connecticut (TSN, CFN, ESPN, SI)
 Kendall Hunter, Oklahoma State (FWAA, Rivals)
 Knowshon Moreno, Georgia (AFCA)
 Jonathan Dwyer, Georgia Tech (PFW)
 MiQuale Lewis, Ball State (CBS)

Fullback
 Tony Fiammetta, Syracuse (PFW)

Wide receiver
 Michael Crabtree, Texas Tech (AFCA, AP, FWAA, TSN, WCFF, CBS, CFN, ESPN, PFW, Rivals, SI)
 Dez Bryant, Oklahoma State (AFCA, AP, TSN, WCFF, CFN, PFW, SI)
 Jarett Dillard, Rice (FWAA, CBS, ESPN)
 Austin Collie, BYU (CBS)
 Jeremy Maclin, Missouri (Rivals)

Tight end
 Chase Coffman, Missouri (AFCA, AP, FWAA, WCFF, CBS)
 Jermaine Gresham, Oklahoma (TSN, CFN, ESPN, PFW, Rivals, SI)

Tackles
 Andre Smith, Alabama (AFCA, AP, FWAA, TSN, WCFF, CBS, CFN, ESPN, PFW, Rivals, SI)
 Michael Oher, Ole Miss (AFCA, AP, FWAA, TSN, WCFF, CBS, CFN, ESPN, Rivals)
 Rylan Reed, Texas Tech (WCFF, SI)
 Jason Smith, Baylor (FWAA)
 Phil Loadholt, Oklahoma (CFN, SI)
 Russell Okung, Oklahoma State (PFW)

Guards
 Duke Robinson, Oklahoma (AP, FWAA, TSN, WCFF, CBS, CFN, ESPN, Rivals, SI)
 Brandon Carter, Texas Tech (AFCA, TSN)
 Andy Levitre, Oregon State (AFCA, PFW)
 Herman Johnson, LSU (AP)
 Mike Johnson, Alabama (PFW)
 Seth Olsen, Iowa (Rivals)
 Kraig Urbik, Wisconsin (ESPN)

Center
 Antoine Caldwell, Alabama (AFCA, AP, TSN, SI)
 A. Q. Shipley, Penn State (FWAA, WCFF, CBS, CFN, ESPN)
 Max Unger, Oregon (CBS, PFW)
 Alex Mack, California (Rivals)

Defense

Ends
 Brian Orakpo, Texas (AFCA, AP, FWAA, WCFF, TSN, ESPN, PFW, SI, CBS, CFN, Rivals)
 Jerry Hughes, TCU (FWAA, WCFF, TSN, ESPN, SI, CBS, CFN, Rivals)
 Aaron Maybin, Penn State (AP, FWAA, WCFF, CBS, PFW)
 George Selvie, South Florida (AFCA)
 Michael Johnson, Georgia Tech (AFCA)
 Nick Reed, Oregon (WCFF)

Tackle
 Terrence Cody, Alabama (AFCA, AP, FWAA, TSN, CBS, Rivals, SI)
 Gerald McCoy, Oklahoma (TSN, CFN, PFW, Rivals, SI)
 Peria Jerry, Ole Miss (AP, PFW, CFN, ESPN)
 Mitch King, Iowa (ESPN)

Linebacker
 Rey Maualuga, Southern California (AFCA, AP, FWAA, TSN, WCFF, CBS, CFN, ESPN, Rivals)
 Brandon Spikes, Florida (AFCA, AP, FWAA, TSN, WCFF, CFN, ESPN, Rivals, SI)
 James Laurinaitis, Ohio State (AFCA, AP, TSN, WCFF, PFW)
 Aaron Curry, Wake Forest (ESPN, PFW, SI)
 Scott McKillop, Pittsburgh (FWAA, CBS)
 Brian Cushing, Southern California (SI)
 Mark Herzlich, Boston College (CFN, PFW, Rivals)

Cornerback
 Malcolm Jenkins, Ohio State (AFCA, AP, FWAA, WCFF, CBS, CFN, ESPN, PFW, Rivals)
 Alphonso Smith, Wake Forest (AFCA, AP,  FWAA, WCFF, CBS, ESPN, PFW)
 D. J. Moore, Vanderbilt (TSN, CFN, Rivals, SI)
 Victor Harris, Virginia Tech (TSN, SI)

Safety
 Eric Berry, Tennessee (AFCA, AP, FWAA, TSN, WCFF, CBS, CFN, ESPN, Rivals, SI)
 Taylor Mays, Southern California (AP, FWAA, TSN, WCFF, CBS, CFN, ESPN, PFW, SI)
 Rashad Johnson, Alabama (AFCA, Rivals)
 Morgan Burnett, Georgia Tech (PFW)

Special teams

Kicker
 Louie Sakoda, Utah (AFCA, AP, FWAA, TSN, WCFF, ESPN, PFW, SI)
 Graham Gano, Florida State (CBS, CFN, Rivals)

Punter
 Kevin Huber, Cincinnati (AFCA, AP, FWAA, Rivals, SI)
 T. J. Conley, Idaho (TSN, WCFF, CFN, ESPN)
 Pat McAfee, West Virginia (CBS)

All-purpose player / return specialist
 Brandon James, Florida (FWAA-RS, TSN, CBS, Rivals-PR)
 Jeremy Maclin, Missouri (AP, WCFF-KR, SI-AP)
 Percy Harvin, Florida (AFCA, Rivals-AP)
 Joe Burnett, UCF (ESPN, SI-KR/PR)
 Michael Ray Garvin, Florida State, (TSN-KR)
 Antonio Brown, Central Michigan (CFN)
 Perrish Cox, Oklahoma State (CBS-KR)
 Mardy Gilyard, Cincinnati (Rivals-KR)
 Travis Shelton, Temple (CFN-KR)
 Derrick Williams, Penn State (PFW-RS)

See also
 2008 All-Big 12 Conference football team
 2008 All-Big Ten Conference football team
 2008 All-Pacific-10 Conference football team
 2008 All-SEC football team

References
 Associated Press 
 AFCA 
 FWAA 
 WCFF 
 TSN 
 ESPN
 SI
 PFW
 CFN
 Rivals
 CBS

All-American Team
College Football All-America Teams